Gatting may refer to three related English sportsmen, or to a Danish sports woman:
Joe Gatting (born 1987), Brighton footballer
Mike Gatting (born 1957), former Middlesex and England cricketer
Steve Gatting (born 1959), former Arsenal, Brighton and Charlton footballer
Steve and Mike are brothers while Joe is the son of Steve.
Michelle Gatting (born 1993), Danish racing driver